Events from the year 1730 in Russia

Incumbents
 Emperor – Peter II (until ), Anna of Russia (after )

Events

Births

 - Alexander Suvorov, Russian military leader, considered a national hero. (d. 1800)

Deaths

 - Peter II of Russia, Emperor. (b. 1715)
 Varvara Michajlovna Arsen'eva, royal mistress and courtier (b. 1676)

References

1730 in Russia
Years of the 18th century in the Russian Empire